Georges Fabre (– ) was a French forestry engineer, now best known for his role in creation of the Forêt Domaniale de l'Aigoual (Aigoual State Forest) and the weather observatory atop Mont Aigoual.

Fabre was born in Orléans, studied at the École polytechnique and the French National School of Forestry in Nancy, from which he graduated in 1868. From 1868-1875 he served as Guard General of Water and Forests in Dijon, then in Mende, after which he was named sub-inspector, then inspector, at Alès. As Gard's reforestation director until 1900, his major achievement was the development of the Forêt Domaniale de l'Aigoual and establishment of the meteorological observatory on its summit. In 1900 he was appointed curator of Forestry in Nîmes, which post he held until his retirement in 1909.

He died in 1911 in Nîmes.

Today the Forêt Domaniale de l'Aigoual extends across about 15,000 hectares, of which 11,000 are in Gard and the remainder in Lozère.

References 
 French Wikipedia entry
 La Maison des Cevennes article (French)

École Polytechnique alumni
French National School of Forestry alumni
Corps du génie rural des eaux et forêts
French conservationists
1844 births
1911 deaths
History of forestry
French foresters
Forestry in France